Telipna nyanza is a butterfly in the family Lycaenidae. It is found in Cameroon, the Republic of the Congo, the Central African Republic, the Democratic Republic of the Congo, Uganda, Zambia and Angola. The habitat consists of forests.

Subspecies
Telipna nyanza nyanza (Uganda)
Telipna nyanza katangae Stempffer, 1961 (eastern Cameroon, Congo, Central African Republic, Democratic Republic of the Congo, Uganda, Zambia, Angola)

References

Butterflies described in 1904
Poritiinae